The KTM Class 22 is a class of mainline diesel electric locomotives designed and equipped by English Electric-AEI Traction, with construction by Metro-Cammell, for operations by Keretapi Tanah Melayu in Malaysia.

Description
The class 22 is a dual cab general purpose locomotive with a full width body. It consists of a basic underframe of rolled channel longitudinal side members connected by cross members at bogie, power unit and equipment mounting points, as well as at buffer beams and drag boxes. Sides consist of fabricated frames with steel panelling welded to the underframe. The prefabricated cabs are also welded to the underframe and sides to form the box structure. Detachable roof panels with hinged covers provide access to components for maintenance and overhaul.

The bogies were designed by English Electric. They are cast steel bolsterless with fully equalised primary suspension using helical coil springs on underslung beams and three-point secondary rubber cushion suspension to the body. To equalise motor reactions, the AEI-253 motors are all mounted on the inner side of each axle.

The engine is the 1,760 bhp V-8 version of English Electric's RK/V Mk III range, turbocharged and intercooled. It provides a 17% increase in power over the 12SVT Mk II engine fitted to the earlier Class 20. The EE822 DC generator is bolted directly to the engine. In February 1995, four (22105, 22107, 22119, 22140) were sent to Morrison-Knudsen's factory in Whyalla, Australia for rebuilding. In April 2001, 22119 arrived at A Goninan & Co, Broadmeadow for rebuilding. It was scrapped in 2004.

After being withdrawn in 2010, four were retained and plinthed as exhibits, while three were sold for use by civil engineering contractors, one going to Bangladesh for use by civil engineering firm Maxx Railway Track after being refurbished by Nippon Kiara in Kuala Lumpur in 2014.

References

External links

 http://www.malayarailway.com/2008/11/ktmb-class-22.html#axzz656WWjRhv

Co-Co locomotives
Diesel-electric locomotives of Malaysia
English Electric locomotives
Keretapi Tanah Melayu
Metre gauge diesel locomotives
Railway locomotives introduced in 1971